Hot toddy is a mixed drink, usually including alcohol, that is served hot.

Hot toddy may also refer to:
"Hot Toddy", a song by Ralph Flanagan & Herb Hendler
"Hot Toddy", a 1974 song by Nino Ferrer

See also
"Hot Tottie", Toddy coffee or cold brew coffee, the process of steeping coffee grounds in room temperature water for an extended period
Palm wine or Toddy, an alcoholic beverage created from palm tree sap
"Hotty Toddy", an Ole Miss Rebels football cheer